In organic chemistry, hexene is a hydrocarbon with the chemical formula . The prefix "hex" is derived from the fact that there are 6 carbon atoms in the molecule, while the "-ene" suffix denotes that there is an alkene present—two carbon atoms are connected via a double bond. There are several isomers of hexene, depending on the position and geometry of the double bond in the chain.  One of the most common industrially useful isomers is 1-hexene, an alpha-olefin.  Hexene is used as a comonomer in the production of polyethylene.

Isomers 
The following is a partial list of hexenes.

There are a total of 13 different alkene isomers of hexene, excluding additional geometric (E/Z) and optical (R/S) isomers:

 hex-1-ene
 hex-2-ene (E/Z)
 hex-3-ene (E/Z)
 2-methylpent-1-ene
 3-methylpent-1-ene (R/S)
 4-methylpent-1-ene
 2-methylpent-2-ene
 3-methylpent-2-ene (E/Z)
 4-methylpent-2-ene (E/Z)
 2,3-dimethylbut-1-ene
 3,3-dimethylbut-1-ene
 2-ethylbut-1-ene
 2,3-dimethylbut-2-ene

See also 
cyclohexene
neohexene

References

Alkenes